André Jobin (August 8, 1786 – October 11, 1853) was a notary and political figure in Lower Canada and Canada East.

Biography
He was born in Montreal in 1786 and studied at the Collège Saint-Raphaël there. He qualified as a notary in 1813 and set up practice in Montreal. He was named a justice of the peace in 1830 but opposed the use of the militia to maintain order in 1832 after riots followed the election of Daniel Tracey. He was elected to the Legislative Assembly of Lower Canada in an 1835 by-election for Montreal County. Jobin was arrested in May 1838 and charged with sedition, but never tried; he was released in July.

Following the merger of Lower Canada and Upper Canada into the Province of Canada, he ran unsuccessfully in Vaudreuil in 1841.  The supporters of his opponent, John Simpson, used intimidation to discourage Jobin's supporters. However, he was elected for Montreal County as a Reformer in an 1843 by-election and reelected in 1844 and 1848. He helped prepare legislation regarding the licensing and practice of notaries in the province. Jobin was a director of the Montreal City and District Savings Bank and a lieutenant-colonel in the local militia.

He died in Sainte-Geneviève on the Island of Montreal in 1853.

References

External links
 

1786 births
1853 deaths
Members of the Legislative Assembly of Lower Canada
Members of the Legislative Assembly of the Province of Canada from Canada East
People from Montreal
Canadian justices of the peace
Collège Saint-Raphaël alumni